Christopher I'Maul Johnson (born August 7, 1971) is a former American football free safety.  He played professionally in the National Football League (NFL) for the Minnesota Vikings. He played college football for San Diego State Aztecs.

References

1971 births
Living people
American football safeties
Minnesota Vikings players
San Diego State Aztecs football players
Players of American football from Dallas